Roger Sylvis Mahoney (July 19, 1906 – March 12, 1981) was an American football player. He played college football for Penn State and in the National Football League (NFL) as a center, guard and end for the Frankford Yellow Jackets (1928-1930) and Minneapolis Red Jackets (1930). He appeared in 42 NFL games, 30 as a starter.

References

1906 births
1981 deaths
Penn State Nittany Lions football players
Frankford Yellow Jackets players
Minneapolis Red Jackets players
Players of American football from Philadelphia
American football ends
American football guards
American football centers